O'Brien Peak is a rock peak, 670 m, standing 3 nautical miles (6 km) west of the north extremity of Medina Peaks, along the edge of the Ross Ice Shelf. Discovered in December 1929 by the Byrd Antarctic Expedition geological party under Laurence Gould, and named by Byrd for John S. O'Brien, surveyor with that party.

See also
Paradise Ridge

References

Mountains of the Ross Dependency
Amundsen Coast